Barry Schiff is an American pilot and author of more than 1,800 articles published in 111 aviation magazines, notably AOPA Pilot of which he is a contributing editor. Schiff has been an aviation media consultant and technical advisor for motion pictures for more than 40 years. Schiff holds 10 journalism awards from the Aviation/Space Writers Association and four special awards from the FAA. He is also a member of the Aviation Speakers Bureau.

Biography

With 28,000 hours logged in 357 different types of aircraft, Schiff has received worldwide recognition for his wide-ranging aeronautical accomplishments. He received his ATP license at 21, and has earned every FAA category and class rating (except airship). Schiff holds eleven type ratings and every possible instructors rating. He has also been an FAA-designated check airman on the Boeing 767 and a general aviation designated pilot examiner. Schiff retired from Trans World Airlines in 1998 after a 34-year career during which he flew the Lockheed Constellation, the Boeing 707, 727, 747, 757, 767 and the Lockheed TriStar 1011.

Schiff holds five world speed records and has received numerous honors for his many contributions to aviation safety. These include a Congressional Commendation (1975), the Louis Bleriot Air Medal (France), Switzerland's Gold Proficiency Medal, an honorary doctorate from the Embry-Riddle School of Aeronautics (1980), and AOPA's L.P. Sharples Perpetual Award. Schiff has been inducted into the New Jersey Aviation Hall of Fame and the EAA/NAFI National Flight Instructor's Hall of Fame, and was elected as an Elder Statesman of Aviation by the National Aeronautic Association. Captain Schiff was inducted in 2012 as a Living Legend of Aviation.

In 1963, Schiff sold his publishing company Aero Progress, Inc to Elrey Jeppesen; Schiff is an aviation journalist and author, being well known to flying audiences for his numerous books and aviation articles. His articles have earned him eleven prestigious journalism awards. Many of his articles discuss personally developed concepts, procedures and techniques that have received international acclaim.

Schiff's flight experience includes experimental flight testing of light aircraft, transoceanic, polar and international aircraft operation, air taxi, corporate, and flight-training activities. He has flown numerous military aircraft including Lockheed's U-2 and SR-71 Blackbird. Schiff also developed and worked to have adopted the concept of providing general aviation pilots with safe VFR routes through high density airspace.

In 1995 and with the direct approval of Jordanian King Hussein and Israeli Prime Minister, Itzhak Rabin, Schiff contributed to the Middle East peace process by leading a formation of 35 airplanes carrying 135 Americans, Israelis, and Jordanians from Jerusalem to Amman. Codename "Operation Peace Flight", Schiff became the first pilot ever allowed to fly between those countries. Schiff is currently retired from TWA and is currently working as a journalist and aviation expert witness.

In 2020 Schiff along with son Brian Schiff conducted FAA aviation Runway safety seminars for NAFI.

Works

Bibliography 
 All About Flying: An introduction to the World of Flying - Publisher Aero-Products Research - Copyright 1964
 The Boeing 707 (Famous Aircraft Series) - Publisher Arco Publishing - - Copyright 1967 - Pages 80
 Flying: Golden Science Guide - Publisher Golden Press - (ISBN) - Copyright 1971 - Pages 160
 The Vatican Target - Publisher St. Martin's Press - Copyright 1979 - - Pages 273
 Flight 902 is Down - Publisher St Martins Press - Copyright 1982 - - Pages 264
 The Proficient Pilot Volume 1 - Publisher ASA - - Copyright Date: 2001 - Pages 330
 The Proficient Pilot Volume 2 - Publisher ASA - - Copyright Date: 2001 - Pages 328
 The Proficient Pilot Volume 3 - Publisher ASA - - Copyright Date: 2001 - Pages
 The Proficient Pilot, Volume 3: Flying Wisdom - Publisher ASA - - Copyright Date: - Pages 360
 Test Pilot: 1,001 Things You Thought You Knew about Aviation - Publisher ASA - - Copyright Date: - Pages 400
 Dream Aircraft: The Most Fascinating Airplanes I've Ever Flown - Publisher ASA - - Copyright Date: 2007 - Pages 328

Filmography
 Proficient Flying Volume 1
 Proficient Flying Volume 2
 Proficient Flying Volume 3
 Operation Peace Flight
 ABC's Wide World of Flying Video Series
 Technical adviser in numerous  motion pictures

References

https://www.aopa.org/news-and-media/articles-by-author/barry-schiff

External links
 barryschiff.com - Barry Schiff's personal website
 Retired Airline Captain Barry Schiff to Speak at Embry-Riddle Commencement - News Release
 'AOPA Pilot' contributor shares joy of flight
 Barry Schiff's biography
 http://www.aviationspeakers.com - Biography
 National Association of Flight Instructors
 The Spirit Flies On - Essay by Barry Schiff

American aviation writers
Aviators from New Jersey
Living people
Trans World Airlines people
1938 births
American aviation record holders
American flight instructors